Roy Edward Halling (born December 31, 1950, in Perry, Iowa) is an American mycologist.

Halling specializes in the study of mushroom-forming fungi, especially the taxonomy, ecology, and systematics of the Boletineae, a suborder of the Boletales, and is widely published in this area. He is currently emeritus curator of mycology at the New York Botanical Garden, and was an adjunct professor at Columbia University.

Halling received his master's degree from San Francisco State University in 1976, with a thesis titled "The Boletaceae of the Sierra Nevada", under the supervision of Harry Delbert Thiers. His PhD was from the University of Massachusetts Amherst, in 1980 with a dissertation titled "The genus Collybia in New England. His supervisor was Howard E. Bigelow.

Halling has served as the associate editor of the journal Brittonia (1984–1989), the managing editor of Mycologia (1986–1996), and as the associate editor of the latter journal from 2002–2004.

Halling was the president of the Mycological Society of America in 2008–2009.

Selected publications 

Halling, R.E. 1989. "Notes on Collybia III. Three neotropical species of subg. Rhodocollybia". Mycologia 81(6):870–875.
Tulloss, R.E.; Ovrebo, C.L.; Halling, R.E. 1992. "Studies on Amanita (Amanitaceae) from Andean Colombia". Memoirs of the New York Botanical Garden 66:1–46.
Mueller, G.M.; Halling, R.E. 1995. "Evidence for high biodiversity of Agaricales (Fungi) in neotropical montane Quercus forests". In: S. Churchill, H. Balslev, E. Forero, & J. Luteyn, (eds.). Biodiversity and Conservation of Neotropical Montane Forests. New York Botanical Garden, Bronx.
Halling, R.E. 1996. "Boletaceae (Agaricales): Latitudinal biodiversity and biological interactions in Costa Rica and Colombia". Revista de Biología Tropical 44(Supplement 4):111–114.
Antonín, V.; Halling, R.E.; Noordeloos, M.E. 1997. "Generic concepts within the groups of Marasmius and Collybia sensu lato". "Mycotaxon" 63:359–368
Fulgenzi, T.D.; Mayor, J.R.; Henkel, T.W; Halling, R.E. 2008. "New species of Boletellus from Guyana." Mycologia 100(30):490–495.

References

External links 
 Image from Harvard University Herbaria

San Francisco State University alumni
University of Massachusetts Amherst alumni
American mycologists
1950 births
Living people